The Maerua Mall is a shopping complex in Windhoek, Namibia. Expanded to more than double its original size in 2006, Maerua Mall is now the third largest shopping mall in Namibia and contains a number of retail outlets, including Ackermans, @home,  FNB, Total Sports, Stuttafords. Along with Wernhil Park Mall and The Grove Mall, the malls are the largest formal shopping venues in Namibia.

Maerua mall lies opposite Centaurus High School in Windhoek. It is currently the most popular mall in Namibia. It is the one of the 2 malls in Namibia which contains a cinema and a Virgin Active gym. Maerua has various restaurants including Wimpy, Mugg and Bean, Picollo and Panarottis.

References

External links
Official Website

Shopping malls in Namibia
2006 in Namibia
Buildings and structures in Windhoek
Shopping malls established in 2006